Laurence Michael Foley, Sr. (October 5, 1942 – October 28, 2002) was an American diplomat who was assassinated outside his home in Amman, Jordan.

Career
Born in Boston, Massachusetts, Foley became a Peace Corps volunteer in 1965, serving two years in India upon graduating from the University of Massachusetts. After earning a master's degree in Rehabilitation Counseling at San Francisco State University in 1969, he served as a probation officer in Contra Costa County, California. He later worked for the Peace Corps, serving as Associate Director of the Peace Corps program in the Philippines from 1980 to 1985.  He served as Director of Administration at the Rehabilitation Services of Northern California until joining the United States Agency for International Development (USAID) in 1988. After working in Bolivia, Peru, and Zimbabwe, Foley became Supervisory Executive Officer of USAID/Jordan in 2000.

Death
On the morning of October 28, 2002, Foley was killed by gunshots from a 7 mm pistol as he walked to his car outside his Amman home. On December 14, two men, Libyan Salem bin Suweid and Jordanian Yasser Freihat, were arrested and charged with killing Foley. According to the Jordanian government, the men were paid to kill Foley by Abu Musab al-Zarqawi, an Islamist militant leader, who at that time was the commander of the group later renamed al-Qaeda in Iraq. Though the men confessed, they later claimed they were forced to by Jordanian authorities.

In April 2004, the two men were sentenced to death for killing Foley. Zarqawi was sentenced to death in absentia for his role in the assassination, but was killed in a U.S. airstrike on June 7, 2006. Foley's assassins were executed on March 11, 2006. Another conspirator, Mohammed Ahmed Youssef al-Jaghbeer, was sentenced to death on July 13, 2009.

References

1942 births
2002 deaths
2000s murders in Jordan
2002 crimes in Jordan
2002 murders in Asia
People from Boston
American diplomats
Assassinated American diplomats
Deaths by firearm in Jordan
American terrorism victims
Terrorism deaths in Jordan
American people murdered abroad
People murdered in Jordan
Peace Corps volunteers
American expatriates in India
American expatriates in the Philippines
American expatriates in Jordan